Alpha-pinene monooxygenase is an enzyme with systematic name (-)-alpha-pinene,NADH:oxygen oxidoreductase. This enzyme catalyses the following chemical reaction

 (-)-alpha-pinene + NADH + H+ + O2  alpha-pinene oxide + NAD+ + H2O

Alpha-pinene monooxygenase takes part in catabolism of alpha-pinene.

References

External links 
 

EC 1.14.13